Frank Carlson (January 23, 1893May 30, 1987) was an American politician who served as the 30th governor of Kansas, Kansas State representative, United States representative, and United States senator from Kansas. Carlson is the only Kansan to have held all four offices. His political career spanned 40 years, beginning in November 1928 and ending in January 1969.

Early life and education
Carlson was born in 1893 near Concordia, Kansas, the son of Anna (Johannesson) and Charles Eric Carlson, both Swedish immigrants. He attended public schools and Kansas State University before serving in World War I as a Private.

Career 

After the war, he returned to Concordia to farm. He was elected as a Republican to first the Kansas House of Representatives in 1928 and then to the United States House of Representatives, where he served from 1935 to 1947.

In 1946 he was elected governor of Kansas. As governor, he pushed mental health programs as well as a long-term highway project. In 1949, Kansas State Senator Clyde M. Reed died, and Carlson appointed Harry Darby to fill the seat. Darby continued his service in the Senate until Carlson himself was elected to fill the seat in 1950. Instead of waiting until January to be sworn in, he took his seat on November 28, 1950, leaving the office of governor to Frank L. Hagaman who served less than two months.

In 1952, he campaigned for Dwight D. Eisenhower, and then brokered a deal through Ohio Senator Robert A. Taft and became Senate majority leader. According to Billy Graham's biography Just As I Am, Carlson invited Eisenhower to the Senate Prayer Breakfast, which thus became the first Presidential Prayer Breakfast, thereafter an annual assembly of all three branches of government, continuing to this day. Carlson was re-elected twice, in 1956 and 1962, before returning to Concordia for retirement.

Carlson served a term as president of the United States Senate Prayer Breakfast Group. He was therein featured by U.S. News & World Report on July 1, 1968, by editor, David Lawrence, for his strong moral and spiritual influence in the nation's capital. He was also a member of the board of directors of World Vision.

Carlson voted in favor of the Civil Rights Acts of 1957, 1964, and 1968, as well as the 24th Amendment to the U.S. Constitution, the Voting Rights Act of 1965, and the confirmation of Thurgood Marshall to the U.S. Supreme Court, but did not vote on the Civil Rights Act of 1960.

Death
Carlson died in 1987 in Concordia and was buried there in Pleasant Hill Cemetery. The federal court building in Topeka is named in his honor, US 81 from the Nebraska state line north of Belleville to Salina is named the Frank Carlson Memorial Highway, the Frank Carlson Library in Concordia is named in his honor, and Wichita State University hosts the Frank Carlson Lecture Series.

Frank Carlson Library
In April 2011, the Frank Carlson Library in Concordia, Kansas, received a mini grant from the Kansas Humanities Council to renovate the library's Frank Carlson Room. The grant funded the development of a new exhibit dedicated to telling new generations of Kansans about Carlson's life and political career. Coinciding with the yearlong Kansas 150 Commemoration, the renovation was part of a statewide initiative to preserve the memory of important people and events in the state's past. Senator Frank Carlson is the only Kansan to have held four major public offices and is known as "Kansas' Favorite Son".

The renovation project replaced the original Frank Carlson display, created in 1976 and shown until the summer of 2011. The new exhibit, Frank Carlson: Prairie Politician, tells and preserves Senator Carlson's story through an updated exhibit and modern archival techniques. The exhibit showcases Carlson memorabilia, photographs, and items from the Senator's personal collection, which is housed in the Frank Carlson Library. Senator Carlson's story is told in three parts, beginning with his childhood and church leadership in Concordia, Kansas, following him through his forty-year political career, and celebrating his legacy as a political figure and an important local figure.

Among the items on display are a check from President Dwight D. Eisenhower, written to Carlson in settlement of a friendly bet, several pens used by President Lyndon B. Johnson to sign important legislation that Carlson supported, and Carlson's elephant figurine collection. The exhibit also includes artifacts that tie Carlson to his hometown and home state. On display are the school bell from the schoolhouse Carlson attended in Cloud County, Kansas, caricatures and political cartoons drawn by fellow Concordian Don Musik, and keepsakes on loan from Carlson's friends and family.

References

Other sources
Homer E. Socolofsky (1990) Kansas Governors (University Press of Kansas)

External links 
Frank Carlson Library website
 
 Biographical Directory of the United States Congress
 Governor's Mansion Information

 Publications concerning Kansas Governor Carlson's administration available via the KGI Online Library

|-

|-

|-

|-

|-

1893 births
1987 deaths
People from Cloud County, Kansas
American people of Swedish descent
Republican Party members of the United States House of Representatives from Kansas
Republican Party United States senators from Kansas
Candidates in the 1968 United States presidential election
Republican Party governors of Kansas
Republican Party members of the Kansas House of Representatives
20th-century American politicians
People from Concordia, Kansas
Kansas State University alumni
United States Army personnel of World War I
United States Army soldiers